Joe May (1880–1954) was an Austrian-American film director and film producer.

Joe May may also refer to:
Joe T. May (born 1937), American electrical engineer and politician from Virginia
Joseph May (born 1974), British actor
Joseph May (politician) (1816–1890), New Zealand politician
Brother Joe May (1912–1972), American gospel singer
Joe D. May, educator and leader in the post-secondary college and technical school field